Hikmat Ramdani  (born 25 March 2001) is an Indonesian para badminton player. He won two gold medal at the 2021 Asian Youth Para Games in Boys' singles and Mixed doubles.

Achievements

World Championships
Men's singles

Men's doubles

Asian Para Games 

Men's singles

Mixed doubles

ASEAN Para Games 
Men's singles

Asian Youth Para Games 

Boys' singles

Mixed doubles

BWF Para Badminton World Circuit (2 titles, 1 runner-up) 

The BWF Para Badminton World Circuit – Grade 2, Level 1, 2 and 3 tournaments has been sanctioned by the  Badminton World Federation from 2022. 

Men's singles 

Men's doubles

Mixed doubles

International Tournaments (1 runner-up) 
Men's doubles

References

Notes

External links
 Hikmat Ramdani at BWFpara.tournamentsoftware.com

Living people
Indonesian male badminton players
Indonesian para-badminton players
2001 births
21st-century Indonesian people